The Harapaki Wind Farm is a wind farm project in the Hawke's Bay region of New Zealand. Construction began in June 2021 and is expected to continue for three years.

History
In 2006, Hawkes Bay Wind Farm Ltd was granted resource consent for a 75 turbine, 225 MW wind farm at Titiokura. The same year Unison Networks was granted consent for a 15 turbine, 45 MW development. Both consents were upheld by the Environment Court in October 2006. A proposed expansion of Unison's project was rejected by the Environment Court in 2009.

In 2010 Hawkes Bay Wind Farm Ltd was purchased by Meridian Energy. Unison's consent was purchased in 2011, and the sites combined. 

In August 2019 Meridian sought interest from potential contractors for the wind farm's construction. Construction was expected to begin in 2020, but was delayed due to the possible closure of the Tiwai Point aluminium smelter.  In February 2021 Meridian announced that construction would begin later that year, and would take approximately three years. Site preparation began in mid-2021. The first turbines arrived in Napier in March 2023.

Location 
The wind farm is being built on the Maungaharuru Range, near the Titiokura Summit, about 34 km northwest of Napier Airport. The altitude of the range is approximately 1300 metres.

Operation 
Electricity will be supplied to the national grid via a new substation on Transpower's Redclyffe-Whirinaki-Wairakei 220 kV transmission line.

See also 
 Wind power in New Zealand

References

External links 
 Harapaki Wind Farm
 NZ Wind Energy Association Hawkes Bay Consented Site

Proposed wind farms in New Zealand
Buildings and structures in the Hawke's Bay Region